Namori Diaw (born 30 December 1994) is a Mauritanian footballer who plays as a goalkeeper for Kédia and the Mauritania national team.

International career
Diaw made his debut for Mauritania on 24 March 2018 against Guinea. He was included in Mauritania's squad for the 2018 African Nations Championship in Morocco.

Career statistics

International
Statistics accurate as of match played 24 March 2018

References

External links
 
 

1994 births
Living people
Mauritanian footballers
Mauritania international footballers
Association football goalkeepers
2018 African Nations Championship players
2019 Africa Cup of Nations players
Mauritania A' international footballers
2022 African Nations Championship players